Robert Laurier (March 31, 1892 – April 4, 1967) was a Canadian barrister and political figure in Ontario, Canada. He represented Ottawa East in the Legislative Assembly of Ontario as a Liberal member from 1940 to 1945.

He was born in Arthabaska, Quebec, the son of Henri Laurier, and was educated at Loyola College, McGill College and Osgoode Hall. He married Gabrielle Parent, the daughter of Simon-Napoléon Parent who was a premier of Quebec and mayor of Quebec City. Laurier served as Minister of Mines in the provincial cabinet from 1940 to 1943. He died after a long illness in 1967

He was the nephew of Sir Wilfrid Laurier.

References 
 Canadian Parliamentary Guide, 1945, AL Normandin

External links 
Member's parliamentary history for the Legislative Assembly of Ontario
Biography of Robert Laurier 

1892 births
1967 deaths
Ontario Liberal Party MPPs
Members of the Executive Council of Ontario
Franco-Ontarian people
McGill University alumni